Outlawed terror organisations in New Zealand includes the designation of terrorist entities as a measure the New Zealand Government has established under the Terrorism Suppression Act 2002 (TSA). The aim of the list of outlawed organisations is to contribute to the international campaign against terrorism. The  Act provides for a list of terrorist entities to be established and maintained. The New Zealand Police are responsible for coordinating any requests to the Prime Minister for designation as a terrorist entity. Implications for such designation include outlawing the financing of, participation in and recruitment to, terrorist entities. Designation under New Zealand legislation results in the freezing of any assets of terrorist entities; it is a criminal offence to participate in or support the activities of the designated terrorist entity.

List of designated terror organisations
As of June 2022, the following groups (and all associated individuals or organisations) are designated as terrorist entities:

See also
 Outlawed terror organisations in Australia

References

Illegal organizations